Ann "Muffet" McGraw (born December 5, 1955) is an American former college basketball coach, who served as the head women's basketball coach at Notre Dame from 1987 to 2020, compiling a 848–252 (.771) record over 33 seasons.

Career
She led her team to nine Final Fours (1997, 2001, 2011, 2012, 2013, 2014, 2015, 2018 and 2019), seven championship game appearances (2001, 2011, 2012, 2014, 2015, 2018, and 2019), and two National Championships in 2001 and 2018. McGraw was the sixth different Division I coach to win multiple NCAA titles, joining Geno Auriemma, Pat Summitt, Linda Sharp, Tara VanDerveer and Kim Mulkey

McGraw was born in Pottsville, Pennsylvania. She graduated from Saint Joseph's University and briefly played professionally for the California Dreams of the Women's Professional Basketball League. She coached at Archbishop Carroll HS from 1977 to 1979, and worked as an assistant coach at Saint Joseph's from 1980 to 1982. From 1982 to 1987 she was head coach at Lehigh University where one of her notable players was Cathy Engelbert.

She became head coach at Notre Dame in 1987. Between 1987 and 2020, McGraw led the Irish to 26 NCAA tournament appearances including a streak of 24 straight seasons from 1995 to 2019. During the current streak, Notre Dame made it to the second round in all but one of the appearances, including 7 championship game appearances. McGraw compiled 50 wins over ranked opponents, including 40 over the last 8 seasons. Her teams appeared in the AP poll 139 times during her tenure. Notre Dame finished in the Top 3 of the Big East in 9 out of the 11 seasons they were in the league and finished in first place in the Atlantic Coast Conference in all 4 seasons since they entered the conference.

McGraw was awarded the US Basketball Writers Association (USBWA) Coach of the Year award, the Women's Basketball Coaches Association Coach of the Year and the Naismith College Coach of the Year in 2001. She was inducted into the Women's Basketball Hall of Fame in 2011 and the Naismith Memorial Basketball Hall of Fame in 2017. In 2016, the John R Wooden award committee recognized McGraw with the 2017 Legends of Coaching Award.

She is the 27th coach in NCAA history to win over 500 career games, and is currently tied as the eighth head coach in NCAA Division I basketball history to reach 800 career wins. On April 1, 2018, McGraw achieved her 800th career victory at Notre Dame with a win over the Mississippi State Bulldogs in the National Championship game, her second national title with the Fighting Irish. On December 30, 2018, she notched her 900th career win against Lehigh, the team at which she began her collegiate coaching career in 1982.

On April 22, 2020, McGraw announced that she was stepping down as the head coach of Notre Dame.

Personal life
She married her husband, Matt McGraw, in October 1977.

Awards and honors

 2001 – AP College Basketball Coach of the Year
 2001 – Russell Athletic/WBCA National Coach of the Year
 2009 – Carol Eckman Award
 2011 – Women's Basketball Hall of Fame
 2013 – Naismith Women's College Coach of the Year
 2013 – AP College Basketball Coach of the Year
 2013 – Women's Basketball Coaches Association (WBCA) Division I Coach of the Year
 2014 – espnW Coach of the Year
 2014 – AP College Basketball Coach of the Year
 2014 – USBWA Coach of the Year 
 2014 – Russell Athletic/WBCA National Coach of the Year
 2016 – Legends of Coaching Award (2017)
 2017 – Naismith Memorial Basketball Hall of Fame
 2018 – AP College Basketball Coach of the Year
 2023 – NCAA President's Pat Summitt Award

Head coaching record

See also
List of college women's basketball coaches with 600 wins

References

External links

1955 births
Living people
American women's basketball coaches
Basketball coaches from Pennsylvania
Basketball players from Pennsylvania
Guards (basketball)
High school basketball coaches in the United States
Lehigh Mountain Hawks women's basketball coaches
Naismith Memorial Basketball Hall of Fame inductees
Notre Dame Fighting Irish women's basketball coaches
Saint Joseph's Hawks women's basketball coaches
Saint Joseph's Hawks women's basketball players
Sportspeople from Pottsville, Pennsylvania
Women's Professional Basketball League players